Keleswaram Mahadeva Temple  is a Hindu temple dedicated to Lord Shiva in the state of Kerala, India. The temple is situated in Keleswaram, a village in Thiruvananthapuram, the state capital of Kerala.

The management of the temple
The temple is under the management of Travancore Devaswom Board.

Important days
Maha Shivaratri and Thiruvathira are the days which attract huge crowds to the temple.

Darshan
One of the speciality of this temple is Shiva Linga faces towards west. It is rarely seen.
Darshan timings :
 Morning - 5.20 to 10.00
 Evening - 5.00 to 8.00

Deities and sub-deities 
The main deity of the temple is Hindu god Shiva. There are many upadevathas (sub-deities) adjacent to the temple.

The main upadevathas on the premises are:

 Vishnu
 Durga
 Lord Ganesh
 Nagaraja
 Lord Murugan
 Lord Ayyappan

References

See also
 List of Hindu temples in Kerala
 Sreekanteswaram
 Kamaleswaram Mahadeva Temple

Hindu temples in Thiruvananthapuram district
Shiva temples in Kerala